James Harley Kennan SC (25 February 1946 – 4 August 2010) was an Australian politician and later adjunct professor of law at Deakin University.

Kennan earned a Master of Laws from the University of Melbourne. He was a member of parliament between 1982 and 1993, initially in the Victorian Legislative Council, and then in the Legislative Assembly as the member for Broadmeadows and was Deputy Premier of Victoria from 1990 to 1992.

After the defeat of the Labor Party Government at the 1992 state election, and the later retirement of leader Joan Kirner in March 1993 he became the Leader of the Opposition until his shock retirement from Parliament three months later. He was succeeded as leader and member for Broadmeadows by a former member of the Legislative Council, John Brumby.

Kennan is the last ALP leader who did not become Premier.

He worked as a Senior Counsel in the Victorian legal system, most notably representing Jack Thomas at his re-trial on terrorism charges in late 2008.

Death
Kennan died on 4 August 2010, aged 64, after a battle with cancer.

References

 

1946 births
2010 deaths
Members of the Victorian Legislative Council
Members of the Victorian Legislative Assembly
Victorian Ministers for the Environment
Australian Labor Party members of the Parliament of Victoria
Australian barristers
Deputy Premiers of Victoria
University of Melbourne alumni
Academic staff of Deakin University
Recipients of the Centenary Medal
Deaths from cancer in Victoria (Australia)
People educated at Scotch College, Melbourne
Leaders of the Opposition in Victoria (Australia)
Australian Senior Counsel
Attorneys-General of Victoria
Melbourne Law School alumni
Politicians from Melbourne